František Čech (born 15 June 1998) is a professional Czech football defender currently playing for Hradec Králové in the Czech First League.

He made his senior league debut for Hradec Králové on 13 May 2017 in their Czech First League 2–1 home win against Slovácko. He scored his first goal on 27 May in a 1–0 home win against Bohemians 1905.

References

External links 
 
 František Čech official international statistics
 
 František Čech  profile on the FC Hradec Králové official website

Czech footballers
Czech Republic youth international footballers
1998 births
Living people
Czech First League players
FC Hradec Králové players
Association football defenders
Czech National Football League players